Kim Malthe-Bruun (8 July 1923 – 6 April 1945) was a Canadian-born seaman and a member of the Danish resistance executed by the German occupying power.

Biography 
He was born in Edmonton, Alberta, Canada and baptized in St. George's church. At the age of nine, Kim, his six-year-old sister Ruth, and his mother moved back to Denmark where she was originally from. He grew up a farmhand, but by the time he was seventeen, he had become a merchant seaman. When Nazi Germany invaded Denmark, he joined the Danish resistance movement at the age of 21. He used his skills as a sailor to transport arms for the resistance.

On 19 December 1944, Kim was arrested by the Gestapo in an apartment on Classen Street with two friends. He was unarmed and carrying his own identification papers. He was sent to the Vestre Fængsel Prison soon after his arrest. The first cell he stayed in was Cell 252, in the German Section.

On 15 January 1945 he received royal permission to change his name to Kim Malthe-Bruun.

On Wednesday, 21 February, Kim was sent to the Police Headquarters for questioning.  He did not return to Vestre until Wednesday, 28 February.  The next day he was placed in solitary confinement and forbidden to write letters.

In a letter to his girlfriend, he stated the cells he had been in so far:
19 December 1944 – 2 February 1945, Cell 252
2 February 1945, at 8 o'clock - Cell 585 (he called a "dark cell")
7 February - 11 February - Frøslev
12 February - 11 March - Cells 286, 284, 282, 276, and 270 (in Vestre Fængsel)
1 March - 2 March - Cell 586
5 March - 12 March - Cell 50 (Police Headquarters)
15 March- ? - Cell 37 (Police Headquarters)

On 6 April 1945, Kim Malthe-Bruun was executed in Ryvangen.

After his death 
On 11 June 1945 Malthe-Bruun's remains were recovered in Ryvangen.

On 29 August Malthe-Bruun and 105 other victims of the occupation were given a state funeral in the memorial park founded at the execution and burial site in Ryvangen where his remains had been recovered. Bishop Hans Fuglsang-Damgaard led the service with participation from the royal family, the government and representatives of the resistance movement.

After the war his mother published a book about him titled Heroic Heart: The Diary and Letters of Kim Malthe-Bruun. It contains his diary entries and many of his letters home to both her and his girlfriend Hanne.

In the afterword to her work of historical fiction, Number the Stars, Lois Lowry likened the character Peter Neilsen, a resistance member, to Kim, possibly for his courage against the Nazis. She also wrote of Kim "seeing the quiet determination in his boyish eyes made me determined, too, to tell his story, and that of all the Danish people who shared his dreams." She ends the afterword with a quote to his mother from one of his last letters from jail.

A Danish documentary about Kim Malthe-Bruun was made in 2009.

References

Sources

External links

1923 births
1945 deaths
Danish resistance members
Canadian sailors
Danish sailors
Resistance members killed by Nazi Germany
Canadian people of Danish descent
Deaths by firearm in Denmark
Canadian people executed by Nazi Germany
Danish people executed by Nazi Germany
People executed by Nazi Germany by firing squad
Grut Hansen family